James Theuri (born October 30, 1978, in Kanjinji, Kenya) is a French athlete who specialises in the marathon. Theuri competed at the 2009 World Athletics Championships.

References

French male long-distance runners
French male marathon runners
1978 births
Kenyan emigrants to France
Living people
World Athletics Championships athletes for France